The 2008 UCI BMX World Championships took place in Taiyuan in China and crowned world champions in the cycling discipline of BMX racing. Great Britain's Shanaze Reade won her second consecutive world championships in the elite women's category, whilst Latvian Māris Štrombergs won the elite men's category.

Medals table

Medal summary

External links

Union Cycliste Internationale website

UCI BMX World Championships
UCI BMX World Championships
International cycle races hosted by China
Uci Bmx World Championships, 2008